High-maltose corn syrup is a food additive used as a sweetener and preservative. The majority sugar is maltose. It is less sweet than high-fructose corn syrup and contains little to no fructose. It is sweet enough to be useful as a sweetener in commercial food production, however. To be given the label "high", the syrup must contain at least 50% maltose.  Typically, it contains 40–50% maltose, though some have as high as 70%.

By using β-amylase or fungal α-amylase, glucose syrups containing over 50% maltose, or even over 70% maltose (extra-high-maltose syrup) can be produced.p. 465 This is possible because these enzymes remove two glucose units, that is, one maltose molecule at a time from the end of the starch molecule.

Uses
High-maltose corn syrup is used as a substitute for normal glucose syrup in the production of hard candy: at a given moisture level and temperature, a maltose solution has a lower viscosity than a glucose solution, but will still set to a hard product.  Maltose is also less humectant than glucose, so that candy produced with high-maltose syrup will not become sticky as easily as candy produced with a standard glucose syrup.p. 81

Since maltose has a low freezing point, HMCS is useful in frozen desserts. It is also used in brewing, because it has a balanced fermentability, can be added at high concentrations to the wort kettle, increasing throughput, and reduces haze caused by varying malt quality.  Another of HMCS's uses is to preserve food. According to the Center for Science in the Public Interest, HMCS preserves food by inhibiting fermentation and bacterial growth.

Health effects
In recent years, HMCS has seen an increase in use as a food additive due to the negative reputation of HFCS, as well as the absence of fructose, which is the source of the concern about the  health effects of high fructose corn syrup.

High-maltose syrups produced from corn are gluten-free, but certain syrups produced from wheat or barley may contain small amounts of gluten.  It is unclear whether this can have significant effects in celiac disease.

See also

 List of syrups

References

Corn-based sweeteners
Syrup